The 1995–96 Liga EBA season was the second season of this competition, second tier of Spanish basketball. Due to the reduction of the Liga ACB to 18 teams for the next seasons, there was not any promotion from this league.

Regular season

Group North

Group East

Group Centre

Group South

Previous playoffs

Second round

Group A

Group B

Group C

Group D

Final Eight
The Final Eight of the Liga EBA was held in the Pazo dos Deportes of Lugo.

External links
Liga EBA at Algosemueve.com

Liga EBA seasons
EBA
Second level Spanish basketball league seasons